Indian Railway Stations Development Corporation Limited (IRSDC) was a special purpose vehicle owned by the Rail Land Development Authority (RLDA), Ircon International and RITES. All three companies are owned by the Indian Ministry of Railways. IRSDC was incorporated on 12 April 2012.

On 18 October 2021, as part of a measure to rationalise railway bodies, the Railway Board announced that it would shut down IRSDC, and transfer the stations under its management to the respective zonal railways.

'Special Power' 
According to Section 11, Chapter 4, The Railways Act, 1989, IRSDC has the authority to develop stations for the designated mandated purposes under its purview without requiring to seek approvals from local authorities. The aforementioned section has a non-obstante clause, a legislative device that precludes all extant laws and supersedes them. Therefore, by virtue of this Act, the provisions of all other Acts except the 'land acquisition' Act stand muted, in so far as the intent and purpose of the said clause is concerned. This legal position has been established has stood the "pith and substance" test of Constitutional scrutiny and validity in multiple cases (Subhash Dutta vs. Union of India and Ors. 2001, Goa Foundation and another vs. Konkan Railway Corporation 1992, R. E. Marriott vs Municipality of Howrah, 1940, The Municipal Corporation of Bombay vs the Great Indian Peninsular Railways, UOI Vs. UPSEB, 2001 etc.).

According to the Original Indian Railways Permanent Way Manual (IRPWM) -"Section 11 of the Indian Railways Act No.24 of 1989 and the Government Buildings Act No. IV of 1899 read in conjunction with Sec.291 of the Cantonments Act No. II of 1924 provide for the right to erect buildings on their own land by Railways without having to obtain sanction of the Municipal or Cantonment authorities in whose area the site is situated."This facility in law available to IRSDC is of great essence, as the lack of it assails the capability of the private developers to secure approvals and execute the redevelopment efforts within strict timelines in order to maintain project IRRs.

Nevertheless, in fairness of things, the IRPWM also states that -"In urban areas, the Urban Development Authority must be consulted and rules framed by them followed. Municipal or Local authorities may, however, be consulted, where appropriate, regarding water connections, sewer lines and sewage disposal and similar matters."

Projects

Anand Vihar railway station 
As a part of the mandate, IRSDC seeks the participation of a private entity for the Redevelopment of Anand Vihar Railway Station including interalia all works related to, or incidental to, or required to be undertaken upon the project site in accordance with the provisions of the Development Agreement, and Applicable Laws, including the commercial development, redevelopment and station development, as required to be undertaken (the "Project") on Design, Build, Finance, Operate and Transfer (the "DBFOT") basis, and has decided to carry out the bidding process for selection of a private entity as the bidder to whom the Project may be awarded. Brief particulars of the Project are as follows:

Anand Vihar RFQ 
On 22 February 2016, the official Twitter page, LinkedIn page and the Facebook page of IRSDC reported, vide an official press release, that the RFQ applications for Anand Vihar had been received. The response, that included 13 applications as against 3 applications for Habibganj, was claimed to be "excellent". It was further reported that the interested parties included corporations such as Shapoorji Pallonji, L&T, Tata group, GMR, IL&FS, Mcnally Bharat, Bharti Realty, Essel group, Ahluwalia, IRB Infra, Supreme Infrastructure, Oriental Structure, Bhartiya group, MBL Infrastructure, ASF Infrastructure, Bansal Constructions etc. Additionally, it was intimated through the tweets and the Facebook post that the RFQ submission date for Bijwasan had been postponed to 1 March 2016 upon the request of bidders. the response for this station was described as "huge".

Bijwasan railway station 
Bijwasan is an existing station on Delhi–Rewari line of Indian Railways network, proposed to be redeveloped as a world-class station in the National Capital Region of Delhi near Dwarka. The Request-for-Qualification document for the selection of the implementation agency has been issued by IRSDC for development of Bijwasan Station on DBFOT basis in accordance with the provisions of the development agreement, and local applicable Laws for commercial development, redevelopment and station development. Feasibility study and Master planning exercise has been carried out for development of Bijwasan railway station along with associated facilities and commercial development. Various approvals obtained during the master planning exercise shall be shared by IRSDC with the shortlisted bidders at the second stage i.e., RFP stage.

The developer shall develop the entire project including the station redevelopment and commercial development on preferably DBFOT format. The developer shall be responsible for station facility operations during development/redevelopment and for a fixed period post construction. After this the station operations shall revert to Indian Railways. The commercial area is envisaged to be operated by the developer for a concession period of 45 years (including construction period).

Other stations that would come online in short order are as follows:

Habibganj railway station

Chandigarh railway station

Gwalior railway station

Shivajinagar railway station

Surat railway station / Surat Multi Modal Transportation Hub (MMTH) 
On 16 November 2018, Press Information Bureau, Government of India reported the following in a press release about the decisions made on the planning of the redevelopment of the Surat MMTH:

A truly seamless multi model transport hub integrating all modes of transport is to be developed at Surat Railway station wherein all the three levels of Government, namely Central Government (Railways), State Government (Gujarat State Road Transport Corporation) and local government (Surat Municipal Corporation) have come together to pool their lands and also form a SPV named SITCO. This unique initiative is being spearheaded by Indian Railways Station Development Corporation which has been entrusted to implement the task of Railway Station development/redevelopment projects of the Ministry of Railways.  This project once completed, will transform the face of Surat. Request for Qualification cum Request for Proposal  (RFQ cum RFP) for appointment of Developer to take up the development of Multi-Modal Transportation Hub (MMTH) along with Commercial Development on DBFOT-PPP mode was invited on 17 April 2018 so that in addition to the originally qualified developers, new Developers can also participate along with the already qualified Developers.  After interaction with the probable bidders at GOG level, number of steps has been taken to make this unique project more attractive and risk free to the developers.  The various steps already taken and incorporated in the bidding document as corrigendum are as under:

 Increasing project viability:
 Increased Built-up Area (BUA) - Proposed Commercial Development BUA increased from 5.07 lakh sq.m. to 8.40 lakh sq.m.
 BUA definition modified to exclude basement(s) or any upper floor(s) for satisfying the parking/ fire requirements as per local byelaws.
 Reduced Mandatory Cost - Estimated Cost of Mandatory project has been reduced from INR 1,008 Cr. to INR 895 Cr.
 Increased Commercial Retail Area on Ground Level - Commercial Area at Ground level increased from 3,54,864 sq.m. to 7,84,596 sq.m. considering the local demand at Surat.
 Increased Commercial Development on West Side along Ring Road - Commercial Area increased on West side by shifting the proposed Railway Quarters to Udhna.
 Flexibility for Planning Explicitly – Flexibility has been given to the developer to modify the Commercial Development Plan without disturbing the arearequirements and intent of Mandatory Project.Master Plan has been revised to provide more commercial area on ground.
 IRSDC being declared the nodal agency by Union Cabinet for Railway Station Redevelopment and given full powers for plan approvals over railway land and no change in land use required.
 MoU between Railways, Surat Municipal Corporation (SMC)&Gujarat State Road Transport Corporation (GSRTC)for joint development signed on 17.08.2016
 Regulatory Issues Resolved:
 Special Development Control Regulations - Govt. of Gujarat issued notification regarding relaxation in Comprehensive General Development Control Regulations (CGDCR) – 2017 considering MMTH Surat as a Special Project.
 FSI of 4 is available as per Transit Oriented Zone (TOZ)without any charges.
 Master Plan Approval from Stakeholdershad been done.
 Master Plan signed by DRM Office, WR on 12.09.2018
 Master Plan signed by GSRTC on 20.09.2018
 Master Plan signed by SMC on 26.09.2018
 Same Plan has been issued through Corrigendum-7 to RFQ cum RFP
 Land Entrustment from Stakeholders is in place.
 Railway Land Entrustment confirmed from DRM Office.Expected to be approved soon from Western Railway Headquarters
 In principle approval for Land Entrustment given by SMC & GSRTC for their respective lands.
 Airport Authority of India (AAI) approval has been obtained – maximum permissible height has been relaxed up to 121 mt. AMSL as per NOC
 Environmental Clearance is under process - Application filed on 07.09.2018 and first meeting for TOR of EIA held with State Environment Appraisal Committee (SEAC) on 14.11.2018.
 Other Important Relaxations:
 Flexibility in Commercial Development - Only 40% of the Commercial Development Project to be completed in 8 Years from Effective Date. Balance 60% can be completed in 15 years from the Effective Date (extendable by another 5 years without levy of liquidated damages).
 Performance guarantee for Commercial Development Project has been reduced from 100% to 40% of Commercial Development Cost.
 Milestones of Project Development Fee Instalments payable by the Developer has been realigned to reduce upfront expenditure of Developer.
 Interest rate on balance lease premium payable by the Developer has been reduced from 15% p.a. to 12% p.a.
 Station Revenue Share payable by the Developer to SITCO has been reduced from 50% to 35%.
 Maximum tenure of Sub-License at a time has been increased from 3 years to 9 years.

Mohali railway station

Gandhinagar railway station

Important Events in News

Excerpts from news reports 
"Starting with five station, including two in Delhi, re-development and upgradation of railway stations across the country will be taken up under an agreement between Railway Land Development Authority (RLDA) with Indian Railway Station Development Corporation (IRSDC).""The Chandigarh Administration on Thursday gave green signal to development plans of the Indian Railway Station Development Corporation (IRSDC) to convert Chandigarh railway station into world-class facility.""A senior Railway Ministry official said that the ₹8.5-lakh-crore railway infrastructure modernisation plan has been attracting a number of private companies. IRSDC has roped in one of the top global consulting firms to prepare a business plan for station modernisation.""The railways has chalked out the parameters based on which it would select developers, and also explained the duties and responsibilities of developers. The developers have now been asked to send their suggestion by 15th January 2016 after which the railways would come out with a final document."

References 

Formerly government-owned companies of India
Defunct railway companies of India
Indian companies established in 2012
Companies disestablished in 2021
2021 disestablishments in India
Companies based in New Delhi
Railway stations in India